Rusu or RUSU may refer to:

People 
Rusu clan in Japan
Rusu Masakage, Japanese samurai
Rusu (surname)

Places 
Rusu River, tributary of Valea lui Manole River in Romania
Pârâul Stâna lui Rusu, tributary of the Pârâul Bradului in Romania
Rusu de Jos, town in Bistriţa-Năsăud County, Romania
Rusu de Sus, commune in Bistriţa-Năsăud County, Romania

Organizations 
RUSU, acronym for Reading University Students' Union
RUSU, acronym for RMIT University Student Union

See also 
Rus (surname)
Rusca (disambiguation)
Ruseni (disambiguation)
Rusești (disambiguation)
Rusciori (disambiguation)